Béla Grunberger (22 February 1903 – 25 February 2005) was a Franco-Hungarian psychoanalyst known for his 1969 work L'univers contestationnaire, written with fellow IPA member Janine Chasseguet-Smirgel, under the joint pseudonym 'André Stéphane'. In this book, the authors postulated that the left-wing rioters of May 68 were totalitarian Stalinists, and proffered the hypothesis that they were "affected by a sordid infantilism caught up in an Oedipal revolt against the father".

Notably, Lacan mentioned this book with great disdain. While Grunberger and Chasseguet-Smirgel were still cloaked by the pseudonym, Lacan remarked that for sure none of the authors belonged to his school, as none would stoop to such a low drivel. The authors in turn accused the Lacan School of "intellectual terrorism".

References 

1903 births
2005 deaths
French psychologists
Hungarian psychologists
Hungarian Jews
Hungarian emigrants to France
French psychoanalysts
French centenarians
Men centenarians
20th-century French psychologists